Down to Earth with Zac Efron is an American web documentary series that premiered on Netflix on July 10, 2020. It stars Zac Efron and Darin Olien, who also act as executive producers of the series. The documentary revolves around Efron and his travels around the world to France, Puerto Rico, London, Iceland, Costa Rica, Peru, and Sardinia, and focuses on themes of travel, life experience, nature, green energy and sustainable living practices.
Critics describe it as light in tone, but heavy in questionable health advice and pseudoscience.

A second season filmed solely around Australia aired on November 11, 2022.

Episodes

Season 1 (2020)

Season 2: Down Under (2022)

Reception

Critical response 
For season 1, review aggregator Rotten Tomatoes reported an approval rating of 71% based on 14 reviews, with an average rating of 6.30/10 for the series. The website's critical consensus states, "Zac Efron's earnest exploration certainly comes off as Down to Earth, but the show's lack of focus undermines its important environmental message." Metacritic gave the series a weighted average score of 60 out of 100 based on 4 reviews, indicating "mixed or average reviews".

Ed Cumming of The Independent rated the show two stars out of five, saying "There must be a narrow band of people who care enough about Efron to tune in, but not enough about the environment to find this hopelessly simplistic." At Mashable, Alison Foreman was lukewarm, calling it "a fun enough, silly enough, educational enough trip worth taking if you love Zac or believe you have the capacity to love Zac. But you must love Zac to love Down to Earth."

Writing for the McGill Office for Science and Society, Jonathan Jarry argues the show is basically an advertisement for Darin Olien and the pseudoscientific products he espouses, from cancer-preventing superfoods to self-pasteurized raw goat milk. Jarry states that "the show consistently uses genuine ecological concerns to make us accept claims that do not hold water."

Quoting Jarry, as well as Joseph Schwarcz and Timothy Caulfield, Maggie Lange at Vice includes the show in a growing catalogue of Netflix programming promoting questionable health advice and pseudoscience. "What’s most frustrating about this show is not its sprinkles of bunk; the most frustrating thing about this show is that it mixes bunk with earnest reporting."

In Insider, Lindsay Dodgson writes that "Olien acts as Efron's sidekick and health guru, but much of the supposed science he parrots throughout the series is unverified or disproven", then goes on to list eight health claims made in the series that are in fact wrong.

Emma Baty at Cosmopolitan and Daniel Fienberg at The Hollywood Reporter both focus on the superficiality of the information presented, with Efron and Olien barely taking the time to express enthusiasm about a topic ("Dude!") before moving on to something else.

Kayla Cobb of Decider was more positive, saying the series shows that "Efron was meant to be a travel host", and that he brings "energetic relatability in spades".

Accolades

Lawsuit
A food company named Down to Earth Organics filed a lawsuit with the U.S. District Court for the Southern District of New York in July 2022, against Netflix, Darin Olien and Zac Efron. The company, which has no relationship with the television series, alleges its image is damaged by the association viewers might make with its products, given the series spreads misinformation about wellness. The company argues their allegations are supported by the article by the Office for Science and Society, where Jarry characterizes the show as "insidious nonsense".
The company chose to act when a second season of the show was announced, stating it wanted to prevent further damage to its brand. As of July 2022, the allegations have not been proven in court.

References

External links 
 
 

2020s American documentary television series
2020 American television series debuts
English-language Netflix original programming
Netflix original documentary television series
American travel television series
Environmental television